New Winthorpes is a town in Saint George Parish, Antigua and Barbuda.

History 
The original village of Winthorpes was demolished for the construction of Coolidge International Airport. The original village was moved to where New Winthorpes is today.

The village has historically been a stronghold for the UPP.

Demographics 
New Winthorpes has three enumeration districts.

 40100 NewWinthorpes-North 
 40200 NewWinthorpes-South 
 40300 NewWinthorpes-East

References 

Saint George Parish, Antigua and Barbuda
Populated places in Antigua and Barbuda